Frederic Arthur Cockin was an Anglican Bishop of Bristol in the mid 20th century.

Born on 30 July 1888,  he was educated at Marlborough College and University College, Oxford. He was ordained in 1915, after which he was Curate of St Mary, Newington. Later he was Vicar of the University Church of St Mary the Virgin, Oxford, then a Canon at St Paul's Cathedral. An Honorary Chaplain to the King, he was elevated to the episcopate in 1946 and served for 12 years. He died on 15 January 1969.

References

1888 births
1969 deaths
People educated at Marlborough College
Alumni of University College, Oxford
Honorary Chaplains to the King
20th-century Church of England bishops
Bishops of Bristol